Monopigado is a village of the Thermi municipality. Before the 2011 local government reform it was part of the municipality of Vasilika. The 2011 census recorded 227 inhabitants in the village. Monopigado is a part of the community of Agios Antonios.

See also
List of settlements in the Thessaloniki regional unit

References

Populated places in Thessaloniki (regional unit)